Saraina is a spider genus of the jumping spider family, Salticidae, found in Africa.

Males are about four millimeters long, females reach almost nine millimeters. The relationships of this genus are unclear, as the copulatory organs are so unique that there are no genera with similar structures.

Species
, the World Spider Catalog accepted the following species:
Saraina deltshevi Azarkina, 2009 – Congo
Saraina kindamba Azarkina, 2009 – Congo
Saraina rubrofasciata Wanless & Clark, 1975 (type species) – Ivory Coast, Cameroon, Nigeria

Distribution
The original description was based on five females from Ivory Coast, Nigeria and Cameroon. Others were later discovered in the Republic of the Congo. Several males have later been found.

References

 Szűts, T. & Scharff, N. (2005). "Redescriptions of little known jumping spider genera (Araneae: Salticidae) from West Africa". Acta zoologica hungarica 51(4): 357-378. PDF (with drawings).

Salticidae
Salticidae genera
Spiders of Africa